The following foreign delegations attended the 24th Congress of the French Communist Party in 1982:

 Afghanistan - People's Democratic Party of Afghanistan (PDPA)
 Angola - Movimiento Popular de Libertação de Angola - Partido do Trabalho (MPLA-PT)
 Algeria - National Liberation Front (FLN)
 Argentina - Communist Party of Argentina (PCA)
 Australia - Communist Party of Australia (CPA)
 Austria - Kommunistische Partei Österreichs (KPÖ)
 Bahrain - National Liberation Front - Bahrain
 Belgium - Parti Communiste de Belgique (PCB)
 Benin - People's Revolutionary Party of Benin (PRPB)
 Bolivia - Partido Comunista de Bolivia (PCB)
 Brazil - Partido Comunista Brasileiro (PCB)
 Britain - Communist Party of Great Britain (CPGB)
 Bulgaria - Bulgarian Communist Party (BKP)
 Cambodia - People's Revolutionary Party of Kampuchea (PRPK)
 Canada - Communist Party of Canada (CPC)
 Cape Verde - African Party for the Independence of Cape Verde (PAICV)
 Central African Republic - Front Patriotique Oubanguien - Parti du Travail de Centrafrique
 Chad - Front National de Libération du Tchad (FROLINAT)
 Chile - Partido Comunista de Chile (PCCh)
 Chile - Socialist Party of Chile (PS)
 China - Communist Party of China (CPC)
 Colombia - Colombian Communist Party (PCC)
 Comoros - Front National Uni des Komoriens-Union des Komoriens (FNUK)
 Congo - Parti Congolais du Travail (PCT)
 Cuba - Communist Party of Cuba (PCC)
 Cyprus - Progressive Party of Working People (AKEL)
 Czechoslovakia - Komunistická Strana Československa (KSČ)
 Denmark - Danmarks Kommunistiske Parti (DKP)
 Dominica - Popular Independence Committee (PIC)
 Dominican Republic - Dominican Communist Party (PCD)
 DPRK - Workers' Party of Korea (WPK)
 East Timor - Frente Revolucionária de Timor-Leste Independente (FRETILIN)
 Ecuador - Partido Comunista de Ecuador (PCE)
 Egypt - Egyptian Communist Party (ECP)
 Egypt - National Progressive Unionist Party (al-Tagammu)
 El Salvador - Frente Farabundo Martí de Liberación Nacional (FMLN)
 El Salvador - Partido Comunista de El Salvador (PCES)
 Ethiopia - Commission for Organizing the Party of the Working People of Ethiopia (COPWE)
 Finland - Suomen kommunistinen puolue (SKP)
 German Democratic Republic - Sozialistische Einheitspartei Deutschlands (SED)
 Greece - Communist Party of Greece (KKE)
 Greece - Panhellenic Socialist Movement (PASOK)
 Grenada - New Jewel Movement (NJM)
 Guadeloupe - Parti Communiste Guadeloupéen (PCG)
 Guinea - Parti Démocratique de Guinée (PDG-RDA)
 Guinea-Bissau - Partido Africano da Independência da Guiné e Cabo Verde (PAIGC)
 Guyana - People's Progressive Party (PPP)
 Haiti - Unified Party of Haitian Communists (PUCH)
 Hungary - Magyar Szocialista Munkáspárt (MSzMP)
 Iraq - Iraqi Communist Party (ICP)
 Iran - Tudeh Party of Iran
 Ireland - Communist Party of Ireland (CPI)
 Israel - Communist Party of Israel (Rakah)
 Italy - Partito Comunista Italiano (PCI)
 Japan - Japanese Communist Party (JCP)
 Jordan - Communist Party of Jordan
 Laos - Lao People's Revolutionary Party (LPRP)
 Lebanon - Lebanese Communist Party (LCP/PCL)
 Lebanon - Progressive Socialist Party (PSP)
 Lebanon - Mouvement National Libanais (MNL)
 Libya - General People's Congress (GPC)
 Luxembourg - Parti Communiste Luxembourgeois (PCL)
 Madagascar - Front National pour la Défense de la Révolution (FNDR)
 Mali - Front Malien de la Révolution et la Démocratie
 Malta - Partit Komunista Malti (CPM)
 Martinique - Martinican Communist Party (PCM)
 Mexico - Mexican Unified Socialist Party (PSUM)
 Mongolia - Mongolian People's Party (MPRP)
 Morocco - Parti du Progrès et du Socialisme (PPS)
 Morocco - Union Socialiste des Forces Populaires (USFP)
 Mozambique - Frente de Libertação de Moçambique (FRELIMO)
 Namibia - South-West Africa People's Organisation (SWAPO)
 Netherlands - Communistische Partij van Nederland (CPN)
 Nicaragua - Frente Sandinista de Liberación Nacional (FSLN)
 Nigeria - Socialist Party of Working People of Nigeria
 Norway - Norges Kommunistiske Parti (NKP)
 Pakistan - Communist Party of Pakistan (CPP)
 Palestine - Palestine Liberation Organization (PLO)
 Panama - Partido del Pueblo de Panamá
 Paraguay - Partido Comunista Paraguayo (PCP)
 People's Democratic Republic of Yemen - Yemeni Socialist Party (YSP)
 Poland - Polish United Workers' Party (PZPR)
 Portugal - Partido Comunista Português (PCP)
 Puerto Rico - Partido Socialista Puertorriqueño (PSP)
 Réunion - Communist Party of Réunion (PCR)
 Romania - Romanian Communist Party (PCR)
 Oman - Popular Front for the Liberation of Oman (PFLO)
 San Marino - Partito Comunista Sammarinese (PCS)
 San Marino - Partito Socialista Sammarinese (PSS)
 Spain - Communist Party of Spain (PCE)
 South Africa - African National Congress (ANC)
 Sudan - Sudanese Communist Party (SCP)
 Sweden - Vänsterpartiet Kommunisterna
 Syria - Arab Socialist Ba’ath Party
 Syria - Syrian Communist Party (SCP)
 Tunisia - Parti Communiste Tunisien (PCT)
 Turkey - Türkiye Komünist Partisi (TKP)
 Uruguay - Partido Comunista del Uruguay (PCU)
 United States - Communist Party USA (CPUSA)
 USSR - Communist Party of the Soviet Union (CPSU)
 West Germany - Deutsche Kommunistische Partei (DKP)
 West Germany - Sozialistische Einheitspartei Westberlins
 Western Sahara - Frente Popular para la Liberación de Saguía el Hamra y Río de Oro (POLISARIO)
 Yemen Arab Republic - National Liberation Front of Yemen Arab Republic (NLF)
 Yugoslavia - Savez Komunista Jugoslavije (SKJ)

1982 in France
Political party assemblies in France
History of the French Communist Party
)